Killers is a short BBC film written by David Eldridge and directed by Mike Wadham.

Part of the drama lab series on BBC Three, Killers is set in a house in east London in which a group of lads are having a party. It looks at the relationships between young lads and how those relationships change when a female is added to the equation. Overseen by Tony Jordan, it stars Roland Manookian, Brooke Kinsella and Thomas Aldridge.

Cast 

Roland Manookian
Thomas Aldridge
Brooke Kinsella
Neil Maskell
Billy Worth
Freddy White

References

External links

British television films